How About I Be Me (and You Be You)? is the ninth full-length album by Irish singer-songwriter Sinéad O'Connor released in Ireland on 2 March 2012 on Shamrock Solutions and 5 March 2012  in the United Kingdom on One Little Indian. The first single "The Wolf Is Getting Married" was released on 24 February in Ireland and got to number 40 for one week, accompanied by a video directed by Roman Rappak, lead singer of Breton.

The second single "4th and Vine" was released on 18 February 2013, accompanied by a video directed by Kathryn Ferguson. In 2013 O'Connor announced a European tour in support for the album, called The Crazy Baldhead Tour.

As of 2014, sales in the United States have exceeded 18,000 copies, according to Nielsen SoundScan.

Critical reception

Will Hermes of the magazine Rolling Stone graded the album with three out of five stars and found, "empathy, wit and beauty on... [the] focused LP".

Track listing

Live album - Limited special edition

This live album was recorded in three different concerts. Songs 1 to 4 at Dublin Olympia Theatre (Dublin), December 18, 2011; songs 5 to 8 at Frikirkjan Church (Reykjavík), October 14, 2011 (during Iceland Airwaves '11); songs 9 to 12 at St. John at Hackney (London), November 2, 2011.

Personnel
Sinéad O'Connor – vocals
Justin Adams, Marco Pirroni, Kevin Armstrong, Tim Vanderkuil – guitar
Kenny Bogan – acoustic guitar on track 5
Chris Constantinou – bass guitar
Damien Dempsey – acoustic guitar on track 4
Caroline Dale – cello
Samuel Dixon, Clare Kenny – bass guitar
John Reynolds – drums, piano on track 10
Julian Wilson – keyboards

Live album
Sinéad O'Connor - Vocals, Guitar (Tracks 5-8)
Kieran Kiely - Musical Director, Keyboards, Guitar, Accordion, Low Whistle
Ash Soan - Drums (Tracks 1-4)
Yolanda Charles - Bass Guitar, Backing Vocals (Tracks 1-4 & 9-12)
Dave Randall - Guitar (Tracks 1-4 & 9-12)
Rachael Wood - Guitar, Backing Vocals (Tracks 1-4 & 9-12)
Steve Barney - Drums (Tracks 9-12)
Bill Shanley - Guitar (Tracks 5-8)
Rachael Dawson - Cello on track 10, Backing Vocals on track 9
Roisin Waters - Backing Vocals (Tracks 1-4)

Charts

References

External links
 

2012 albums
Sinéad O'Connor albums
One Little Independent Records albums